Staurophora celsia is a moth of the family Noctuidae. The species can be found in Central Europe.

The wingspan is 36–46 mm.

The larvae feed on various grasses, such as  Calamagrostis epigejos, Deschampsia cespitosa, Nardus stricta and Anthoxanthum odoratum.

External links

 Fauna Europaea
 Lepidoptera and some other life forms Funet  Taxonomy
 Moths and Butterflies of Europe and North Africa
 Naturhistoriska riksmuseet Stockholm
Lepiforum.de

Hadeninae
Moths described in 1758
Moths of Japan
Moths of Europe
Taxa named by Carl Linnaeus